Polk Township is an inactive township in Ray County, in the U.S. state of Missouri. It is part of the Kansas City metropolitan area.

History
Polk Township was founded in August, 1845, and named for James K. Polk, who had just then started his first term of presidency.

References

Townships in Ray County, Missouri
Townships in Missouri